The 2015 Nigerian Senate election in Edo State was held on March 28, 2015, to elect members of the Nigerian Senate to represent Edo State. Francis Alimikhena representing Edo North won on the platform of the All Progressives Congress, while Matthew Urhoghide representing Edo South and Clifford Ordia representing Edo Central won on the platform of the People's Democratic Party.

Overview

Summary

Edo Central 
The two major parties All Progressives Congress, and People's Democratic Party registered with the Independent National Electoral Commission to contest in the election. PDP candidate Clifford Ordia won the election, defeating, APC candidate Francis Inegbeniki and other party candidates.

Edo South 
The two major parties All Progressives Congress, and People's Democratic Party registered with the Independent National Electoral Commission to contest in the election. PDP candidate Matthew Urhoghide won the election, defeating, APC candidate Samson Osagie and other party candidates.

Edo North 
The two major parties All Progressives Congress, and People's Democratic Party registered with the Independent National Electoral Commission to contest in the election. APC candidate Francis Alimikhena won the election, defeating, PDP candidate Paschal Ugbome and other party candidates.

References

March 2015 events in Nigeria